Dalibor Takáč (born 11 October 1997) is a Slovak professional footballer who plays as a midfielder for Korona Kielce.

Club career

MFK Ružomberok
In January 2017, he signed three and half year contract with Ružomberok. Takáč made his Fortuna Liga debut for Ružomberok on 26 February 2017 against ŽP Šport Podbrezová. He played as a rotating player during his first season with Ružomberok. 

Takáč played an important role in Ružomberok's Europa League qualification journey in the following season. In the first qualification round against Vojvodina, he came on from the bench in the second leg, forced Nikola Kovačević to score an own goal, which levelled the aggregates, and assisted Ján Maslo with a free kick to help Ružomberok come back from a 1-2 first leg deficiency.  In the next round against Norwegian side Brann, he assisted Kristi Qose with a corner kick and created a penalty kick, which was converted by Dominik Kružliak. Ružomberok came back again to win 2-1 on aggregates.

International
Takáč was called up to Slovakia U21 squad on 22 August 2017 for 2019 UEFA European Under-21 Championship qualification matches against Estonia and Northern Ireland. It was his first time to be nominated by the Slovak national team of any year level.

References

External links
 MFK Ružomberok official club profile
 
 Futbalnet profile

1997 births
Living people
Sportspeople from Košice
Slovak footballers
Association football midfielders
FC VSS Košice players
MFK Ružomberok players
Korona Kielce players
2. Liga (Slovakia) players
Slovak Super Liga players
I liga players
Ekstraklasa players
Slovak expatriate footballers
Slovak expatriate sportspeople in Poland
Expatriate footballers in Poland